This is a list of episodes of the animated children's television series, Miss Spider's Sunny Patch Friends, created by David Kirk. The series aired for three seasons.

Series overview

Episodes

Season 1 (2004-2005)

Season 2 (2004–2006)

Season 3 (2006–2009)

Special (2006)

References

External links
 Miss Spider's Sunny Patch Friends on Noggin
 Miss Spider's Sunny Patch Friends on Nick Jr. – For Parents
 Episode Guide on TV.com
 Miss Spider's Sunny Patch Friends Episode Guide
 
 Miss Spider on TreehouseTV.com

Miss Spider
Miss Spider
Miss Spider